The following is a list of straight-chain alkanes, the total number of isomers of each (including branched chains), and their common names, sorted by number of carbon atoms.

References 

Alkanes
Alkanes